Louie Smotherman is a retired American soccer player who played professionally in the USISL A-League.

Smotherman’s father, an American Army civilian was working in Vietnam when he married a local Vietnamese woman. Smotherman was born in Vietnam, but his family moved to Arizona when he was a baby. He graduated from Greenway High School where he was an All State soccer player. Smotherman attended Lander University, playing on the men’s soccer team from 1988 to 1991. He was a 1991 NAIA All American and graduated with a bachelor's degree in exercise science. In 1997, he moved to the New Orleans Riverboat Gamblers of the USISL A-League. In 1998, he became a player/assistant coach with the Gamblers who were renamed the New Orleans Storm in 1999 before disbanding in 2000.

In 2005, Smotherman became the head coach of the Brother Martin High School boys’ soccer team.  In April 2013, Smotherman became the soccer director at Brother Martin.

External links
 Louisiana Fire Junior: Louie Smotherman

References

Living people
American soccer players
South Carolina Shamrocks players
New Orleans Riverboat Gamblers players
A-League (1995–2004) players
American sportspeople of Vietnamese descent
Lander University alumni
Association footballers not categorized by position
Year of birth missing (living people)
Vietnamese emigrants to the United States